The Dressmaker from Paris is a 1925 American silent romantic comedy drama film directed by Paul Bern. The story was written by Howard Hawks and Adelaide Heilbron. Heilbron also wrote the screenplay. The film starred Leatrice Joy and was her last film for Paramount Pictures. The film was costume designer Travis Banton's first assignment.

Plot
As described in a film magazine review, an American soldier billeted in Paris meets a student of fashion design. She falls in love with him. Back in America, for the purpose of exhibiting recent fashions, she is brought to the small town in which he manages a department store. Her mannequins accompany her. She surprises him and their romance continues.

Cast

Production
Director Paul Bern has his girlfriend Olive Borden in a small role as one of the models. This was Leatrice Joy's last silent film for Paramount. Afterwards, she followed Cecil DeMille to his PDC arrangement production company, which released through the Pathé Exchange company.

Preservation
With no prints of The Dressmaker from Paris located in any film archives, it is a lost film.

References

External links

1925 films
1920s romantic comedy-drama films
American romantic comedy-drama films
American silent feature films
American black-and-white films
Famous Players-Lasky films
Films set in Paris
Lost American films
Paramount Pictures films
1925 lost films
Lost comedy-drama films
1925 comedy films
1925 drama films
1920s American films
1920s English-language films
Silent romantic comedy films
Silent romantic drama films
Silent American comedy-drama films